The 1919 College Football All-America team is composed of college football players who were selected as All-Americans by various organizations and writers that chose College Football All-America Teams in 1919. The two selectors recognized by the NCAA as "official" for the 1919 season are (1) Walter Camp (WC), whose selections were published in Collier's Weekly; and (2) the Frank Menke syndicate (MS).

Consensus All-Americans
For the year 1919, the NCAA recognizes only two selectors as "official" for purposes of its consensus determinations. The following chart identifies the NCAA-recognized consensus All-Americans and displays which first-team designations they received.

All-Americans of 1919

Ends
Bob Higgins, Penn State (College Football Hall of Fame) 
Heinie Miller, Penn 
Lester Belding, Iowa 
Frank Weston, Wisconsin 
Joseph DuMoe, Lafayette 
Earl Blaik, Army 
Red Roberts, Centre 
Dick Reichle, Illinois 
Bernard Kirk, Notre Dame 
Paul Meyers, Wisconsin

Tackles

Pete Henry, Washington & Jefferson (College and Pro Football Hall of Fame) 
Belford West, Colgate (College Football Hall of Fame) 
William Grimm, Washington 
Burt Ingwersen, Illinois 
Duke Slater, Iowa 
Josh Cody, Vanderbilt (College Football Hall of Fame) 
Hoffman, Ohio 
Joseph Murphy, Dartmouth

Guards
Doc Alexander, Syracuse (College Football Hall of Fame) 
Swede Youngstrom, Dartmouth 
Fred Denfeld, Navy 
Jack Depler, Illinois 
Charles Arthur Clark, Harvard 
Lloyd Pixley, Ohio State 
Robert Sedgwick, Harvard 
Pup Phillips, Georgia Tech

Centers

Red Weaver, Centre 
Charles Carpenter, Wisconsin 
Russ Bailey, West Virginia 
Tim Callahan, Yale 
Bum Day, Georgia 
Harry J. Robertson, Syracuse

Quarterbacks
Bo McMillin, Centre (College Football Hall of Fame) 
John Strubing, Princeton 
Benny Boynton, Williams 
James Bradshaw, Nevada

Halfbacks
Chic Harley, Ohio State (College Football Hall of Fame) 
Eddie Casey, Harvard (College Football Hall of Fame) 
Murray Trimble, Princeton 
Arnold Oss, Minnesota 
Bill Steers, Oregon 
Hank Gillo, Colgate 
Bodie Weldon, Lafayette

Fullbacks
Ira Rodgers, West Virginia (College Football Hall of Fame) 
Jim Braden, Yale 
Jim Robertson, Dartmouth

Key

Bold = Consensus All-American
 1 – First-team selection
 2 – Second-team selection
 3 – Third-team selection

Official selectors
 WC = Walter Camp
 MS = Frank Menke Syndicate, by Frank G. Menke

Other selectors
 RE = Reno Evening Gazette, selected by "W.P. Hahn, football expert of national note who is now located in Reno"
 DJ = Dick Jemison

See also
 1919 All-Big Ten Conference football team
 1919 All-Pacific Coast football team
 1919 All-Southern college football team
 1919 All-Western college football team

References

All-America Team
College Football All-America Teams